The Pawtucket Armory is an historic armory building at 172 Exchange Street in Pawtucket, Rhode Island.  One of the major works of William R. Walker & Son, it was built in 1894–5.  Built of red brick with granite and limestone trim, it has a distinctive main block, with crenellated towers at the corners, and is prominently sited near Pawtucket's central business district.  It has a Richardsonian Romanesque entry, recessed under a round archway with wrought iron gates.  The armory drill hall extends to behind the building along Fountain Avenue.

From 2005 to 2010, the armory housed the Jacqueline M. Walsh School for the Performing and Visual Arts.  It is currently home to the Pawtucket Armory Arts Center.

The armory was listed on the National Register of Historic Places in 1983.

See also
National Register of Historic Places listings in Pawtucket, Rhode Island

References

External links

Armories on the National Register of Historic Places in Rhode Island
Military facilities on the National Register of Historic Places in Rhode Island
Buildings and structures in Pawtucket, Rhode Island
National Register of Historic Places in Pawtucket, Rhode Island
Historic district contributing properties in Rhode Island
Tourist attractions in Pawtucket, Rhode Island